Ashik Punchoo (born 8 November 1976) is a Mauritian former international footballer who played as a defender. He won 14 caps for the Mauritius national football team between 2001 and 2004.

References

1976 births
Living people
Mauritian footballers
Mauritius international footballers
Association football defenders